Jordan James Sinnott (14 February 1994 – 25 January 2020) was an English footballer who played as a midfielder. He was the son of the former Huddersfield Town captain Lee Sinnott and was contracted to Northern Premier League side Matlock Town at the time of his death in January 2020. He died following an altercation in Retford town centre where he was attacked.

Career

Huddersfield Town
He attended St Mary's Menston Catholic Voluntary Academy and, later, joined Huddersfield's Town Academy in the late 2000s, eventually becoming the captain of the under-18 team in 2012. During the same year, Sinnott was offered a professional contract.

Following the sacking of Simon Grayson as Huddersfield manager on 24 January 2013, the manager of the under-18 team, Mark Lillis, was promoted to the role of caretaker manager, and gave Sinnott his first appearance in the Huddersfield first team in their 1–1 draw against Leicester City in the 4th round of the FA Cup at the John Smith's Stadium on 26 January 2013. After the match, Sinnott expressed being positive on his debut and described himself as "not really the nervous type!" His first league appearance was as a substitute in Town's 6–1 defeat by Nottingham Forest at the City Ground on 19 February 2013.

Despite only making two appearances, Sinnott was offered a new two-year contract by the club, which he signed, keeping him at the club until 2015.

After eight years at the club, Sinnott was released by Huddersfield after having his contract terminated by mutual consent on 2 February 2015, with his contract due to expire in the summer.

Loan spells
After being told by Huddersfield Town's management that he would be loaned out, it was announced on 6 December 2012, he joined his father, Lee, at Conference North side Altrincham for a month, making six appearances before returning in January 2013.

On 7 August 2013, Sinnott joined Bury on a six-month loan from Huddersfield Town. Sinnott then made his Bury debut three days later, coming on as a substitute for John Rooney in the second half, in a 2–1 loss against Oxford United. Sinnott then scored his first goal in the next game, as Bury beat Accrington Stanley 3–0. After making 10 appearances for the Shakers, he was recalled by Huddersfield on 18 October.

Later career
After being released by Huddersfield Town, Sinnott rejoined his father at Conference North side Altrincham for the second time. He then had spells at F.C. Halifax Town and Chesterfield before joining Alfreton Town in 2018; at the time of his death he was playing for Matlock Town.

Death
Sinnott was found unconscious with a suspected fractured skull in Retford, Nottinghamshire, in the early hours of 25 January 2020, following an altercation in which he was attacked and sustained a head injury. He was admitted to the Northern General Hospital in Sheffield in a critical condition where he died just before 19:00 that evening. Matlock Town and his former club Alfreton Town had both postponed their respective matches earlier that day. Police arrested two men in connection with the fight.

He carried a donor card at the time of his death.

In a tribute following his death, Sinnott's brother Tom, as well as his friend Duane Holmes, sent an appeal to football clubs across the country to send in shirts with Sinnott's name on the back for his funeral. 800 different football shirts were donated from around the world, these were displayed at his funeral at Bradford City's stadium. It was announced that after the funeral, the football shirts would be donated to Sport Relief.

In July 2020, two men, Kai Denovan and Cameron Matthews, were jailed for manslaughter for their part in the "violent, drunken attack" that killed Sinnott. Denovan was jailed for eleven years and Matthews for eight years and three months. A third man, Sean Nicholson, pleaded guilty to affray and was sentenced to fourteen months in prison.

Sinnott was engaged to Kelly Bossons. Following Sinnott's funeral, Bossons discovered she was pregnant with Sinnott's child. Their daughter was born in September 2020.

Career statistics

Club

References

External links

1994 births
2020 deaths
Footballers from Bradford
English footballers
Association football midfielders
Huddersfield Town A.F.C. players
Altrincham F.C. players
Bury F.C. players
Chesterfield F.C. players
Alfreton Town F.C. players
English Football League players
People educated at St. Mary's Catholic High School, Menston
National League (English football) players
Deaths by beating in the United Kingdom
FC Halifax Town players
Matlock Town F.C. players
English manslaughter victims